Sanity Stomp is a double studio album by British rock artist Kevin Coyne which was released in 1980 by Virgin Records.

Background 
Of this album Coyne himself said:
I was quite ill when I made that record, as a matter of fact; I was quite mad, basically. That's why it's called Sanity Stomp.... That's a record I made when I was clinically ninety-five per cent nuts, and the themes are rather odd, but somehow it comes out as sounding all right.

Reception 
Writing for AllMusic, Dave Thompson said:
"If Bursting Bubbles saw Kevin Coyne pursue the joys of anti-production to its logical conclusion, Sanity Stomp -- his second new album in less than a year -- caught him furiously flinging himself back into the fray, at least in part.... few albums have been so aptly titled.

Disk 1

Track listing
 "Fat Man"
 "The Monkey Man"
 "How Strange"
 "Somewhere In My Mind"
 "When (See You Again?)"

 "Taking On The World"
 "No Romance"
 "Too Dark (One for the Hero)"
 "Admit You're Wrong"
 "Formula Eyes"

Personnel
 Kevin Coyne – vocals
 Paul Fox – guitar
 John "Segs" Jennings – bass
 Dave Ruffy – drums
 Gary Barnacle – saxophone
 Paul Wickens – keyboards
(Fox, Jennings, Ruffy and Barnacle were all members of The Ruts)

 Producer: Paul Wickens
 Engineer: David Hunt at Berry Street Studio

Disk 2

Track listing
 "New Motorway"
 "A Loving Hand"
 "Fear of Breathing"
 "In Silence"
 "Taking On the Bowers" (Robert Wyatt)

 "Wonderful Wilderness" (Brian Godding)
 "My Wife Says"
 "The World Speaks" (Brian Godding)
 "You Can't Kill Us"

Personnel
 Kevin Coyne – guitar, keyboards, vocals
 Brian Godding – electric guitar and keyboards
 Robert Wyatt – drums, keyboards
 Bob Ward – second guitar
 Producer: Kevin Coyne 
 Engineer:  Mike at Alvic Studios
 Johnnie Rutter – front cover photography
 Back cover artwork: Robert Coyne

References

1980 albums
Kevin Coyne albums
Virgin Records albums